The Stanovik is a mountain range in the Transbaikal Region (Zabaykalsky Krai) of Siberia, Russia. The southern end of the range is very close to the border with Mongolia. The nearest village is Mordoy (Мордой), Kyrinsky District.

The range is part of the Trans-Baikal conifer forests ecoregion.

Geography
The Stanovik Range is part of the Khentei-Daur Highlands, South Siberian System. It is bound by the Bylir River valley to the west and near its source it connects with the Khentei Range.

Much like in neighboring ranges, the relief is dominated by moderate height mountains with an abundance of steep-slopes and faults. The summits display fragments of the original alignment surface. The range rises in an area prone to earthquakes.

Flora
The slopes of the range are covered with mountain taiga and pre-Alpine forest. The higher elevations have dwarf cedar shrub and are often crowned by golets type bare summits.

See also
List of mountains and hills of Russia
Sokhondo Nature Reserve

References

Mountain ranges of Russia
Khentei-Daur Highlands
ru:Становик (хребет)